Cayn Theakston (born 17 March 1965) is a British former professional road racing cyclist.

Major results

1988
 1st  Overall Volta a Portugal
1st Stage 14
 1st Stages 7 & 8 Volta ao Algarve
 3rd Overall Grande Prémio Jornal de Notícias
1st Prologue & Stage 8
1989
 1st  Overall Grande Prémio Internacional Costa Azul
1st Stage 3
 1st Stage 13 Herald Sun Tour
1990
 1st Prologue Milk Race

References

1965 births
Living people
English male cyclists
Sportspeople from Worcester, England
Volta a Portugal winners